{{DISPLAYTITLE:C8H12N4O5}}
The molecular formula C8H12N4O5 (molar mass: 244.205 g/mol) may refer to:

 Azacitidine
 Ribavirin, or tribavirin

Molecular formulas